In United States pharmaceutical regulatory practice, the PDUFA date is the colloquial name for the date by which the Food and Drug Administration must respond to a New Drug Application or a Biologics License Application. It is part of the regime established by the Prescription Drug User Fee Act to ensure funding of the Food and Drug Administration's drug approval activities in return for adhering to a largely fixed timetable of regulatory actions.

History 
Prior to the Prescription Drug User Fee Act (PDUFA), median approval times of New Drug Applications ranged between 21 and 29 months. The Prescription Drug User Fee Act was first passed in 1992 to facilitate the funding of the Food and Drug Administration while ensuring a more predictable timetable for drug approvals. Under the PDUFA regime, New Drug Applications and Biologics License Applications (together referred to as 'human drug applications' in the PDUFA context) are levied a fee upon filing. In return, the FDA strives to complete review of applications within 10 months for most applications and 6 months for priority reviews. The PDUFA date thus serves as a 'best estimate' of when a decision on a New Drug Application or a Biologics License Application would be forthcoming. This response may be a decision to approve the application or a Complete Response Letter (CRL). 

The PDUFA date may be extended by the Food and Drug Administration in certain circumstances. These include circumstances such as a 'major amendment', e.g. where data submitted to a final study report is updated or data inadvertently omitted is supplied. 

The PDUFA must be reauthorized every five years. The current version, PDUFA VI, was reauthorized as part of the Food and Drug Administration Reauthorization Act (FDARA) signed on 18 August 2017. The reauthorization will expire in September 2022.

Relevance 
The PDUFA date serves as a good first approximation of when a final decision on drug approval can be expected. Sponsors frequently publish PDUFA dates for their pending applications, and while there is no official list of PDUFA dates, several websites collect PDUFA dates from press announcements in a calendar form.

References 

Food and Drug Administration
Pharmaceutical industry
Regulation
Pharmaceutical regulation in the United States